The Handan–Changzhi railway or Hanchang railway, is a major railroad in northern China for the transportation of coal. The railway is named after its terminal cities, Handan in Hebei Province and Changzhi in Shanxi Province.

Route
The Handan–Changzhi railway traverses the Taihang Mountains and has 19 tunnels. The line is used to carry coal from Shanxi to eastern China and for export overseas via ports in Shandong.  The original carrying capacity of the line was raised from 13.9 million tons to 19 million in 1998 and again to 35 million tons in 2007.

Rail connections
Changzhi: Taiyuan–Jiaozuo railway, Shanxi–Henan–Shandong railway
Handan: Beijing–Guangzhou railway, Handan–Jinan railway

See also

 List of railways in China

References

Railway lines in China
Mining railways
Rail transport in Hebei
Rail transport in Shanxi
Railway lines opened in 1984
Coal in China